, born February 7, 1998) is a Japanese figure skater. She has won four senior international medals.

Personal life
Riona Kato was born in Osaka, Japan. She trained in gymnastics as a child.

Career
On the ice from the age of two years and eight months, Riona Kato was encouraged by her aunt, Yukari Kato, a skating coach. She debuted on the ISU Junior Grand Prix series in 2011. 

In 2013, Kato began training in California, coached by Anthony Liu as well as her aunt. She won a bronze medal at the 2013 JGP in Slovakia. Her first senior international was the Triglav Trophy at the end of the 2013–14 season, where she placed 4th.

2014–15 season
Kato began the 2014–15 season by winning two senior medals, silver at the Asian Trophy and bronze at a Challenger Series event, the U.S. Classic. Making her Grand Prix debut, she finished 5th at the 2014 NHK Trophy and earning a personal best of 117.51 in the freeskate. She then went on to finish 7th at the 2015 Japanese Championships.

2015–16 season
For the 2015-16 Grand Prix series, Kato was assigned to compete at 2015 Rostelecom Cup.

She started her season by finishing 5th at the 2015 CS Ondrej Nepela Trophy.

Programs

Competitive highlights 
GP: Grand Prix; CS: Challenger Series; JGP: Junior Grand Prix

References

External links 
 

1998 births
Japanese female single skaters
Living people
Sportspeople from Osaka